Events in the year 1869 in Portugal.

Incumbents
Monarch: Louis I
Prime Ministers: Bernardo de Sá Nogueira de Figueiredo, 1st Marquis of Sá da Bandeira

Events
27 February – King Louis signs a decree of the government, chaired by the Marquis Sá da Bandeira, abolishing slavery in all Portuguese territories.

Births

18 October – José Marques da Silva, architect (died 1947)
24 November – Óscar Carmona, president (died 1951)

Deaths
30 September – Francisco Luís Gomes, physician, writer, historian, economist, political scientist and MP (born 1829)

References

 
1860s in Portugal
Years of the 19th century in Portugal
Portugal